Putt-Putt Saves the Zoo is a 1995 video game and the third of seven adventure games in the Putt-Putt series of games developed and published by Humongous Entertainment. The animation style also changed with this game to hand-drawn animation, in contrast to the pixel art graphics of the previous two games, following the studio's jump from DOS to Windows with Freddi Fish and the Case of the Missing Kelp Seeds the previous year. The game was reissued on April 19, 1999. In November 2011, the game became the first Humongous Entertainment game to be rereleased for iOS and Google Play. Developed by Nimbus Games Inc., the iOS version of this game released by Atari was discontinued. A Nintendo Switch version was released on February 10, 2022, followed by the PlayStation 4 version on the PlayStation Store in November the same year.

Plot
Putt-Putt is excited because today is the grand opening of the Cartown Zoo. He and his dog, Pep, drive visit Mr. Baldini at his grocery store. Mr. Baldini asks Putt-Putt to deliver Zoo Chow to Outback Al, the new zookeeper, to which Putt-Putt agrees. Putt-Putt finds that the zoo gate is locked, so he calls Outback Al, via a speaker, to tell him that he is bringing zoo chow. Al opens the gate for Putt-Putt and the latter enters to find out that six baby animals are missing from the Cartown Zoo: Baby Jambo, the Elephant, Masai, the Giraffe, Kenya, the Lion cub, Zanzibar, the Hippopotamus, Sammy Seal and Little Skeeter, the Boa constrictor. Putt-Putt volunteers to find the animals and Outback Al agrees and sets out to fix up the zoo.

Eventually, Putt-Putt saves Jambo from being attacked by a mouse by using Cheese Squigglies, Sammy from a closed river dam by using a toolbox, Masai from an open drawbridge (and a rock that won't budge), Kenya from a waterfall with a rope, Little Skeeter from the cold in Arcticland by giving him hot cocoa and Zanzibar from a block of ice in the middle of a freezing river. After finding all six baby animals, Putt-Putt notifies Outback Al of his success, to which Outback Al excitedly thanks him for. At the opening ceremony, Outback Al gives Putt-Putt a Junior Zookeeper award for a job well done. Putt-Putt is also given the honors of cutting the ribbon. The zoo is then open to everyone as they all explore the new zoo, ending the game.

Gameplay
The game mechanics are almost the same as its predecessors including the glove box inventory, horn, radio and accelerator. Putt-Putt can acquire a camera so the player can take pictures of the animals and print them out.

Reception

The combined sales of Putt-Putt Saves the Zoo, Putt-Putt Joins the Parade and Putt-Putt Goes to the Moon surpassed one million units by June 1997. During the year 2001 alone, Putt-Putt Saves the Zoo sold 100,972 retail units in North America, according to PC Data.

References

External links
 
 Putt-Putt Saves the Zoo at Humongous Entertainment

Putt-Putt Saves the Zoo
Adventure games
Android (operating system) games
Children's educational video games
Classic Mac OS games
Humongous Entertainment games
IOS games
Linux games
MacOS games
Nintendo Switch games
Point-and-click adventure games
ScummVM-supported games
Single-player video games
Video games developed in the United States
Video games scored by George Sanger
Video games set in zoos
Windows games
Tommo games
UFO Interactive Games games